In medieval England, childwite (or childwit), was a fine levied by the feudal lord on the reputed father when an unmarried unfree woman gave birth to a child. The Oxford English Dictionary cites the following use of the term from 1672:

References

See also 
 Manorialism
Fines
Slavery in England
English society
Feudalism in England
English legal terminology
English family law